Yemeni Indians consist of people of Indian descent who were born in or immigrated to Yemen. Most are descendants of those who migrated from India during the Ancient era and British Raj. 
Yemeni Indians form the minority community of Overseas Indians in the world. They are usually simply referred to as "Indian" in Yemen.

References 

Indian diaspora in Asia